Leucanopsis leucanina is a moth of the family Erebidae. It was described by Cajetan Felder, Rudolf Felder and Alois Friedrich Rogenhofer in 1874. It is found in Colombia, Ecuador and Brazil.

References

 Arctiidae genus list at Butterflies and Moths of the World of the Natural History Museum

leucanina
Moths described in 1874